Mohammad Mahmoud Ghali (1920–29 November 2016) was the Professor of Linguistics and Islamic Studies, Al-Azhar University, Cairo, Egypt. Ghali has spent 20 years interpreting the meanings of the Quran into English. He is the author of an English translation of the Quran, Towards Understanding the Ever-Glorious Quran. Ghali got his PhD in Phonetics from the University of Michigan. He also studied phonetics at the University of Exeter in the UK. Ghali authored 16 books in Islamic studies, in Arabic as well as in English. The English books include Prophet Muhammad and the First Muslim State, Moral Freedom in Islam, Islam and Universal Peace, Synonyms in the Ever-Glorious Quran. Ghali is the founder of the faculty of languages and translation at Al-Azhar University. In addition to being a full-time professor now at the same faculty, he is also a permanent member of many Islamic organizations working in the field of interpreting the meanings of the Quran into different languages in Egypt, Saudi Arabia, Turkey, and other countries.

References

1920 births
2016 deaths
Academic staff of Al-Azhar University
University of Michigan alumni
Egyptian translators
Egyptian expatriates in the United States
Egyptian expatriates in the United Kingdom
Translators of the Quran into English